Bitumen of Judea, or Syrian asphalt, is a naturally occurring asphalt that has been put to many uses since ancient times.

Wood coloration usage 
Bitumen of Judea may be used as a colorant for wood for an aged, natural and rustic appearance.  It is soluble in turpentine and some other terpenes, and can be combined with oils, waxes, varnishes and glazes.

Light-sensitive properties 
It is a light-sensitive material in what is accepted to be the first complete photographic process, i.e., one capable of producing durable light-fast results. The technique was developed by French scientist and inventor Nicéphore Niépce in the 1820s. In 1826 or 1827, he applied a thin coating of the tar-like material to a pewter plate and took a picture of parts of the buildings and surrounding countryside of his estate, producing what is usually described as the first photograph. It is considered to be the oldest known surviving photograph made in a camera. The plate was exposed in the camera for at least eight hours.

The bitumen, initially soluble in spirits and oils, was hardened and made insoluble (probably polymerized) in the brightest areas of the image. The unhardened part was then rinsed away with a solvent.

Niépce's primary objective was not a photoengraving or photolithography process, but rather a photo-etching process since engraving requires the intervention of a physical rather than chemical process and lithography involves a grease and water resistance process.  However, the famous image of the Cardinal was produced first by photo-etching and then "improved" by hand engraving.  Bitumen, superbly resistant to strong acids, was in fact later widely used as a photoresist in making printing plates for mechanical printing processes. The surface of a zinc or other metal plate was coated, exposed, developed with a solvent that laid bare the unexposed areas, then etched in an acid bath, producing the required surface relief.

References 

                            

Photographic processes dating from the 19th century